Guizhou  (formerly Kweichow) is a landlocked province in the southwest region of the People's Republic of China. Its capital and largest city is Guiyang, in the center of the province. Guizhou borders the autonomous region of Guangxi to the south, Yunnan to the west, Sichuan to the northwest, the municipality of Chongqing to the north, and Hunan to the east. The population of Guizhou stands at 38.5 million,  ranking 18th among the provinces in China.

The Dian Kingdom, which inhabited the present-day area of Guizhou, was annexed by the Han dynasty in 106 BC. Guizhou was formally made a province in 1413 during the Ming dynasty. After the overthrow of the Qing in 1911 and following the Chinese Civil War, the Chinese Communist Party took refuge in Guizhou during the Long March between 1934 and 1935. After the establishment of the People's Republic of China, Mao Zedong promoted the relocation of heavy industry into inland provinces such as Guizhou, to better protect them from potential foreign attacks.

Guizhou is rich in natural, cultural and environmental resources. Its natural industry includes timber and forestry, and the energy and mining industries constitute an important part of its economy. Notwithstanding, Guizhou is considered a relatively undeveloped province, with the fourth-lowest GDP per capita in China as of 2020. However, it is also one of China's fastest-growing economies. The Chinese government is looking to develop Guizhou as a data hub.

Guizhou is a mountainous province, with its higher altitudes in the west and centre. It lies at the eastern end of the Yungui Plateau. Demographically, it is one of China's most diverse provinces. Minority groups account for more than 37% of the population, including sizable populations of the Miao, Bouyei, Dong, Tujia and Yi peoples, all of whom speak languages distinct from Chinese. The main language spoken in Guizhou is Southwestern Mandarin, a variety of Mandarin.

Name
The area was first organized as an administrative region of a Chinese empire under the Tang, when it was named Juzhou, pronounced Kjú-jyuw in the Middle Chinese of the period.  During the Mongol-led Yuan dynasty, the character  (ju, "carpenter's square") was changed to the more refined  (gui, "precious or expensive"). The region formally became a province in 1413, with an eponymous capital then also called "Guizhou" but now known as Guiyang.

History 

Evidence of settlement by humans during the Middle Palaeolithic is indicated by stone artefacts, including Levallois pieces, found during archaeological excavations at Guanyindong Cave. These artefacts have been dated to approximately 170,000–80,000 years ago using optically stimulated luminescence methods.

From around 1046 BCE to the emergence of the State of Qin, northwest Guizhou was part of the State of Shu. During the Warring States period, the Chinese state of Chu conquered the area, and control later passed to the Dian Kingdom. During the Chinese Han dynasty (206 BCE–220 CE), to which the Dian was tributary, Guizhou was home to the Yelang collection of tribes, which largely governed themselves before the Han consolidated control in the southwest and established the Lingnan province. During the Three Kingdoms period, parts of Guizhou were governed by the Shu Han state based in Sichuan, followed by Cao Wei (220–266) and the Jin dynasty (266–420).

During the 8th and 9th centuries in the Tang dynasty, Chinese soldiers moved into Guizhou (Kweichow) and married native women. Their descendants are known as Lǎohànrén, in contrast to new Chinese who populated Guizhou at later times. They still speak an archaic dialect. Many immigrants to Guizhou were descended from these soldiers in garrisons who married these pre-Chinese women.

Kublai Khan and Möngke Khan conquered the Chinese southwest in the process of defeating the Song during the Mongol invasion of China, and the newly established Yuan dynasty (1279–1368) saw the importation of Chinese Muslim administrators and settlers from Bukhara in Central Asia.

It was during the following Ming dynasty, which was once again led by Han Chinese, that Guizhou was formally made a province in 1413. The Ming established many garrisons in Guizhou from which to pacify the Yao and Miao minorities during the Miao Rebellions. Chinese-style agriculture flourished with the expertise of farmers from Sichuan, Hunan and its surrounding provinces into Guizhou. Wu Sangui was responsible for the ousting the Ming in Guizhou and Yunnan during the Manchu conquest of China. During the governorship-general of the Qing dynasty's nobleman Ortai, the tusi system of indirect governance of the southwest was abolished, prompting rebellions from disenfranchised chieftains and the further centralization of government. After the Second Opium War, criminal triads set up shop in Guangxi and Guizhou to sell British opium. For a time, Taiping Rebels took control of Guizhou, but they were ultimately suppressed by the Qing. Concurrently, Han Chinese soldiers moved into the Taijiang region of Guizhou, married Miao women, and their children were brought up as Miao.

More unsuccessful Miao rebellions occurred during the Qing, in 1735, from 1795–1806 and from 1854–1873. After the overthrow of the Qing in 1911 and following Chinese Civil War, the Communists took refuge in Guizhou during the Long March (1934–1935). While the province was formally ruled by the warlord Wang Jialie, the Zunyi Conference in Guizhou established Mao Zedong as the leader of the Communist Party. As the Second Sino-Japanese War pushed China's Nationalist Government to its southwest base of Chongqing, transportation infrastructure improved as Guizhou was linked with the Burma Road. After the end of the War, a 1949 Revolution swept Mao into power, who promoted the relocation of heavy industry into inland provinces such as Guizhou, to better protect them from Soviet and American attacks. The 1957 influenza pandemic started in Guizhou and killed a million people around the world.  After the Chinese economic reform began in 1978, geographical factors led Guizhou to become the poorest province in China, with a GDP growth average of 9 percent from 1978 to 1993.

Geography 

Guizhou is a mountainous province, although its higher altitudes are in the west and centre. It lies at the eastern end of the Yungui Plateau.

Guizhou has a humid subtropical climate. There are few seasonal changes. Its annual average temperature is roughly 10 to 20 °C, with January temperatures ranging from 1 to 10 °C and July temperatures ranging from 17 to 28 °C. 

Like in China's other southwest provinces, rural areas of Guizhou suffered severe drought during spring 2010. One of China's poorest provinces, Guizhou is experiencing serious environmental problems, such as desertification and persistent water shortages. From 3–5 April 2010, China's Premier Wen Jiabao went on a three-day inspection tour in the southwest drought-affected province of Guizhou, where he met villagers and called on agricultural scientists to develop drought-resistant technologies for the area.

Biodiversity

The border mountains of Guizhou, Guangxi, and Hunan have been identified as one of the eight plant diversity hotspots in China. The main ecosystem types include evergreen broad-leaved forest, coniferous and broad-leaved mixed forest, and montane elfin forest. Plant species endemic to this region include Abies ziyuanensis, Cathaya argyrophylla, and Keteleeria pubescens. In broad terms, the Yunnan–Guizhou Plateau is one of the vertebrate diversity hotspots of China. At the level of counties, Xingyi is one of nine Chinese vertebrate (excluding birds) diversity hotspots. Animals only known from Guizhou include Leishan moustache toad, Kuankuoshui salamander, Shuicheng salamander, Guizhou salamander, and Zhijin warty newt. 

Caohai Lake with its surroundings is a wetland that is an important overwintering site for many birds. It is a National Nature Reserve and an Important Bird Area identified by BirdLife International.

Politics

Administrative divisions 

Guizhou is divided into nine prefecture-level divisions: six prefecture-level cities and three autonomous prefectures:

These nine prefecture-level divisions are in turn subdivided into 88 county-level divisions (14 districts, 7 county-level cities, 55 counties, and 11 autonomous counties and one special district).

Urban areas

Economy 

As of the mid-19th century, Guizhou exported mercury, gold, iron, lead, tobacco, incense and drugs.

Its natural industry includes timber and forestry. Guizhou is also the third largest producer of tobacco in China, and home to the well-known brand Guizhou Tobacco. Other important industries in the province include energy (electricity generation) - a large portion of which is exported to Guangdong and other provinces - and mining, especially in coal, limestone, arsenic, gypsum, and oil shale. Guizhou's total output of coal was 118 million tons in 2008, a 7% growth from the previous year. Guizhou's export of power to Guangdong equaled 12% of Guangdong's total power consumption. Over the next 5 years Guizhou hopes to increase this by as much as 50%.

Transportation

In 2017, Sun Zhigang, the governor of Guizhou, announced plans to build  of highways,  of inland waterways,  of high-speed rail lines, and 17 airports in three years, in an effort to boost tourism in the province.

Rail 
Guizhou's rail network consists primarily of a cross formed by the Sichuan–Guizhou, Guangxi–Guizhou and Shanghai–Kunming  railways, which intersect at the provincial capital, Guiyang, near the center of the province. The Liupanshui–Baiguo, Pan County West and Weishe–Hongguo railways form a rail corridor along Guizhou's western border with Yunnan. This corridor connects the Neijiang–Kunming railway, which dips into northwestern Guizhou at Weining, with the Nanning–Kunming railway, which skirts the southwestern corner of Guizhou at Xingyi.

As of 2018, Shanghai–Kunming and Guiyang–Guangzhou high-speed railways are operational. Chengdu–Guiyang high-speed railway is under construction.

Demographics

In 1832, the population was estimated at five million.

Guizhou is demographically one of China's most diverse provinces. Minority groups account for more than 37% of the population and they include Miao (including Gha-Mu and A-Hmao), Yao, Yi, Qiang, Dong, Zhuang, Bouyei, Bai, Tujia, Gelao and Sui. 55.5% of the province area is designated as autonomous regions for ethnic minorities. Guizhou is the province with the highest fertility rate in China, standing at 2.19 (urban: 1.31; rural: 2.42).

Religion

The predominant religions in Guizhou are Chinese folk religions, Taoist traditions and Chinese Buddhism. According to surveys conducted in 2007 and 2009, 31.18% of the population believes and is involved in ancestor veneration, while 0.99% of the population identifies as Christian, decreasing from 1.13% in 2004.

The reports did not give figures for other types of religion; 67.83% of the population may be either irreligious or involved in worship of nature deities, Buddhism, Confucianism, Taoism, folk religious sects, and small minorities of Muslims. There are significant ethnic minority populations (the Miao and the Buyei) who traditionally follow their autochthonous religions.

Cuisine

Guizhou is the home of the well-known Chinese liquor Moutai, as well as Lao Gan Ma.

Tourism 
The province has many covered bridges, called Wind and Rain Bridges. These were built by the Dong people.

The southeastern corner of the province is known for its unique Dong minority culture. Towns such as Rongjiang, Liping, Diping and Zhaoxing are scattered amongst the hills along the border with Guangxi.

Three recommended forms 
The World Bank's "Strategic Environmental Assessment Study: Tourism Development in the Province of Guizhou, China" (May 25, 2007) points to three different forms of tourism that should be fostered and developed in Guizhou: Nature-based, heritage-based and rural. Heritage-based tourism provides ethnic minority groups with an opportunity to preserve their unique heritage while still making a living.

Colleges and universities

Guizhou University (Guiyang)
Guizhou Normal University (Guiyang)
Guiyang Medical University (Guiyang)
Guizhou Nationalities University (Guiyang)
Guizhou Institute of Technology (Guiyang)
Zunyi Medical College (Zunyi)
Moutai University (Zunyi)

Media
Guizhou Daily

Notable people
 Shi Jinmo (1881-1969), founder of medical colleges
 Sun Yafang (1955-), engineer, business executive and former Chairwoman of Huawei from 1999 to 2018
 Chuan He (1972-), biologist
 Huang Xiaoyun (1998-), singer and actress
 Zhou Shen (1992-), singer

See also 
 Major national historical and cultural sites in Guizhou
 2020 Guizhou bus crash

Notes

References

Citations

Works cited

External links

Guizhou government website 
Guiyang Government website 
Township level administrative map of Guizhou

 
Provinces of the People's Republic of China
South China
Western China